Julio César Betancio González (born January 3, 1988, in Guadalajara, Jalisco) is a Mexican former professional footballer who played as a midfielder.

References

External links

Living people
1988 births
Footballers from Guadalajara, Jalisco
Mexican footballers
Association football midfielders
Cimarrones de Sonora players
Liga MX players